Queen Gwendolen, also known as Gwendolin, or Gwendolyn (Latin: Guendoloēna) was a legendary ruler of ancient Britain. She is said to have been queen during the 11th century BC.

As told by Geoffrey of Monmouth in his historical account Historia Regum Britanniae, she was the repudiated queen of King Locrinus until she defeated her husband in battle at the River Stour. This river was the dividing line between Cornwall and Loegria, two key locations in ancient Britain. After defeating the king, she took on the leadership of the Britons, becoming their first queen regnant.

Life 
According to Geoffrey of Monmouth, Gwendolen was one of the daughters of Corineus, king of Cornwall, and one of Brutus's warriors. Gwendolen was married to Locrinus, the eldest of King Brutus' three sons, and had a son named Maddan. Upon her father Corineus' death, Locrinus divorced her in favour of his Germanic mistress, Estrildis (by whom he already had a daughter who was named Habren). Gwendolen then fled to Cornwall, where she lived for a few years. After having built up a large army, she waged war against her ex-husband, King Locrinus. In a battle near the River Stour, Locrinus was killed. Gwendolen then assumed his throne and ruled independently, as her father had reigned in Cornwall. After having both her husband's mistress, Estrildis, and her daughter, Habren, drowned in the River Severn (Old Welsh: Habren), the ancient British monarch reigned peacefully for fifteen years. She then abdicated in favour of her son and lived out the remainder of her life in Cornwall.

Legacy 
The Historia Regum Britanniae says that at the time of her death Samuel was judge in Judaea, Aeneas Silvius was ruling Alba Longa, and Homer was gaining fame in Greece. She is mentioned in Spenser's poem The Faerie Queene (1590) as Gwendolene, and appears in the mythopoeic writings of William Blake as one of the twelve Daughters of Albion. In the 20th century feminist critics have cited her as an example of a powerful woman healing a fractured Britain with her rule.

References

British traditional history
Cornish people
Legendary monarchs
Mythological queens
People whose existence is disputed
Repudiated queens
Women in ancient European warfare
Women in war in Britain